Kenneth MacAlpin (810 – 13 February 858) or Kenneth I was King of Dál Riada (841–850), King of the Picts (843–858), and the first King of Alba (843–858) of likely Gaelic origin. He inherited the throne of Dál Riada from his father Alpín mac Echdach, founder of the Alpínid dynasty. Kenneth I conquered the kingdom of the Picts in 843–850 and began a campaign to seize all of Scotland and assimilate the Picts, for which he was posthumously nicknamed An Ferbasach ("The Conqueror"). Forteviot became the capital of his kingdom, and he also fought the Britons of the Kingdom of Strathclyde and the invading Vikings from Scandinavia. Kenneth also relocated relics including the Stone of Scone from an abandoned abbey on Iona to his new domain.

Kenneth I is traditionally considered the founder of Scotland, which was then known as Alba, although like his immediate successors, he bore the title of King of the Picts. One chronicle calls Kenneth the first Scottish lawgiver but there is no information about the laws he passed.

Origin 

According to the genealogy of the Scottish kings, Kenneth's father was Alpín mac Echdach, the King of Dál Riada, which existed in what is now western Scotland. Alpín is considered to be the grandson of Áed Find, a descendant of Cenél nGabráin, who ruled in Dál Riada. The Synchronism of the Irish Kings lists Alpín among the kings of Scotland. Modern historians are sceptical about the reign of Alpín in Dál Riada and his relationship with Áed, and believe this misconception is the result of negligence on the part of the scribes in some texts. The genealogy of the kings of Scotland and Dál Riada dates back to an original manuscript that was written during the reign of Malcolm III in the mid-to-late 11th century. The Rawlinson B 502 manuscript provides the following ancestry for Kenneth:

There is very limited information about Alpín, the father of Kenneth. Some of Dál Riada's royal lists, which contain many scribal errors, say he ruled from 841 to 843. The Chronicle of Huntingdon, which was written in the late 13th century, states Alpín defeated the Picts at Galloway but the Picts then defeated him in a battle that took place in the same year, during which Alpín was killed. According to the chronicle, Alpín died on 20 July 834. This date is given in other sources but several researchers claim the date was probably copied from another source and the year of his death was obtained by recalculating the dates in the erroneous royal lists so they attribute Alpín's date of death to 840, or 841.

Alpín's mother is likely to have been a Pictish princess, the sister of Constantine I and Óengus II. According to the Pictish tradition, a female representative of the royal dynasty could inherit the crown. This origin gave Kenneth a legitimate claim to the Pictish throne.

Kenneth I had at least one brother, Donald I, who succeeded him as king.

Life and reign

Early years 
Kenneth MacAlpin is believed to have been born around 810 on the island of Iona, which is part of modern-day Scotland. After his father's death, Kenneth succeeded him as the King of Dál Riada. His coronation took place in 840 or 841. One of the main sources on the life of Kenneth is the 10th-century Chronicle of the Kings of Alba which describes the reigns of Scottish kings from Kenneth I to Kenneth II.

Conquest of Pictavia 

According to the Chronicle of the Kings of Alba, Kenneth came to a region that was inhabited by the Picts, during the second year of his reign in Dál Riada. Having defeated the Picts, Kenneth ruled there for 16 years. According to the Annals of Ulster, compiled in the 15th century, he became the King of the Picts in 842 or 843, and died in 858.  Although some sources state Kenneth ruled the Picts from 841 to 856, according to the Chronicle of Melrose, he became king in 843, a date that is generally accepted by most modern-day historians.

In the first half of the 9th century, the geopolitical situation in Dál Riada deteriorated. Almost the entire territory of the kingdom was mountainous, and was filled with uneasy terrain. Kenneth's realm lay between the powerful Kingdom of Strathclyde in the south and the Druim Alban mountain ridge in the east. It was difficult to pass through the provinces of Dál Riada, most of the land was infertile, and the kingdom had lost its western territories in the Hebrides to the Vikings, who had settled in the area and were raiding the borders of Dál Riada. These conditions may have forced Kenneth to attack the Picts.

After the death of Eóganan mac Óengusa in 839, Uurad, and then Bridei VI succeeded him as the King of the Picts. According to List One, Uurad's reign lasted three years, while Brude VI reigned for a year. According to List Two, Uurad reigned for two years, while Bridei VI's reign lasted a month. The reigns of Uurad's three sons were also present in List Two. Based on these accounts, the Pictish kingdom fell in 849 or 850. Many sources dating to the following periods state that the historical kingdom of the Picts and the Scots unified in 850. List Two states that the last Pictish King was killed in Forteviot or Scone. This is probably a reference to MacAlpin's treason, a medieval legend first recorded in the 12th century by Giraldus Cambrensis. According to the legend, a Pictish nobleman is invited by the Scots to a meeting or a feast in Scone and is treacherously killed there. At the same time, List One gives the year 843 as the date when Kenneth received the title of King of the Picts.

Sources do not detail Kenneth's conquest of Pictavia. No chronicle mentions either Kenneth's continuing his father's campaign against the Picts or his supposed claim to the Pictish crown. Modern-day historians suggest Kenneth was a descendant of Pictish kings through his mother or had ties with them through his wife. It is likely the death of Eógananhe, Chronicle of Huntingdon gives the following interpretation of the events that took place after Eóganan's death:

It is likely Kenneth killed the Pictish leaders and destroyed their armies during his conquest of Pictavia, after which he devastated the whole country. The Annals of the Four Masters record a single battle during Kenneth's campaign, which according to Isabel Henderson, proves the Picts did not show any significant resistance to Kenneth's forces, however, more evidence will have to be presented.

King of Alba 
According to historical tradition, a new kingdom was formed after Kenneth annexed the kingdom of the Picts. This kingdom's Gaelic name was Alba, which was later replaced with Scotia and Scotland. The rulers of the kingdom initially held the title of King of Alba. Kenneth is listed in the royal lists dating to later periods as the first King of Scotland; modern historians, however, believe the final unification of the kingdom took place half a century later and that Kenneth's main political achievement should be considered the creation of a new dynasty. This dynasty sought to dominate all of Scotland, under which the Scots assimilated the Picts, resulting in their quick disappearance of the Picts' language and institutions.

After the conquest of Pictavia, the Scots from Dál Riada began to migrate en masse to the territories populated by the Picts. The list of Pictish kings concludes in 850 and the list of kings of Dál Riada also ends around the same time, meaning the title ceased to exist. Kenneth I and his administration moved to Pictavia; it is possible the Scots moved to the region before the war and that such settlements played a major role in the selection of Scone as the kingdom's capital. Kenneth moved relics from an abandoned abbey on Iona, where Viking raids made life untenable, to Dunkeld, which was the centre of the Church of Scotland, in 848 or 849, according to The Chronicle of the Kings of Alba. The coronation stone was also moved from the island to Scone, for which it is referred to as the Stone of Scone. According to archaeological excavations, Forteviot was probably originally a royal residence but the place is not mentioned in the chronicles after the death of Donald I. The mass migration of Scots to the east most likely led to the assimilation of the Picts. Although the Irish annals, which date to the late 9th century, mention the title King of the Picts, the Picts may not have remained independent. The Pictish civil system and clerical laws were completely replaced with the Scottish legal system, and it is likely similar changes occurred in other spheres of the Pictish society. The Picts did not revolt against this assimilation process.

The Chronicle of the Kings of Alba describes the events that occurred during Kenneth's reign without specifying their dates. He invaded Lothian in the Kingdom of Northumbria six times, and captured the towns of Melrose and Dunbar, and razed them. The Celtic Britons from the Kingdom of Strathclyde attacked Kenneth's kingdom and burnt Dunblane. Furthermore, Viking invaders raided Pictavia, ravaging the territories "from Clunie to Dunkeld".

Kenneth strengthened his power by arranging royal marriages with neighbouring states, marrying his daughters to the kings of Strathclyde and Ireland. According to the Chronicle of Melrose, Kenneth was one of the first Scottish lawgivers but his laws have not survived to the 21st century.

Death and succession 
According to the Annals of Ulster, Kenneth died in 858. The Chronicle of the Kings of Alba states he died in February in Forteviot due to a tumour. Historians suggest this date might be 13 February. Kenneth was buried in Iona Abbey. Succession in the kingdom was carried out in the form of tanistry so Kenneth's successor was his brother Donald rather than his eldest son. After the death of Donald I, the sons of Kenneth, Causantín mac Cináeda and Áed mac Cináeda, inherited the crown. The Alpínid dynasty, which ruled Scotland until the beginning of the 11th century, was formed during this period.

Contemporaneous Irish annals give Kenneth and his immediate successors the title King of the Picts but do not call him the King of Fortriu, a title that was only given to four Pictish kings who reigned in the 7th to 9th centuries. It is possible the use of the title of King of the Picts was in reference to Kenneth and his immediate successors' claim to all of Pictavia, though there is very little evidence of the extent of their domain.

Family 
The name of Kenneth's wife is unknown. There is a hypothesis she may have been a Pictish princess. Kenneth's children were:

 Causantín mac Cináeda, King of Alba
 Áed of the White Flowers, King of Alba
 Unknown daughter. She married Rhun ab Arthgal, the King of Strathclyde, and had a son, Eochaid, who may have ruled as King of Strathclyde and/or King of the Picts
 Máel Muire ingen Cináeda. She married Áed Findliath, the High King of Ireland.

There is also a theory the wife of Amlaíb Conung, the King of Dublin, was a daughter of Kenneth.

Notes

References

Sources

Further reading

External links 

 
 
 
 
 
 
 
 

 
 

810 births
858 deaths
9th-century births
9th-century Scottish monarchs
Pictish monarchs
Kings of Dál Riata
Gaelic monarchs in Scotland
Burials at Iona Abbey
Founding monarchs
Kenneth I